Lomami is one of the 21 new provinces of the Democratic Republic of the Congo created in the 2015 repartitioning.  Lomami, Kasaï-Oriental, and Sankuru provinces are the result of the dismemberment of the former Kasaï-Oriental province.  Lomami was formed from the Kabinda district and the independently administered city of Mwene-Ditu.  The town of Kabinda was elevated to capital city of the new province.

See also
Kasai region

References

External links
Archive of official website in 2017

 01
Provinces of the Democratic Republic of the Congo
2015 establishments in the Democratic Republic of the Congo